The Mitsubishi 2MB1 (service designation 八七式軽爆撃機, Army Type 87 Light Bomber) was a light bomber produced in Japan in the mid-1920s to equip the Imperial Japanese Army.

Development
It was developed in parallel to the 2MB2, but while that aircraft featured an innovative and unorthodox design, the 2MB1 was a more conservative approach based closely on the 2MT carrier-based torpedo bomber that was already in production for the Imperial Japanese Navy. Like the 2MT, the 2MB1 was a conventional two-bay biplane with open cockpits in tandem and fixed tailskid undercarriage. The 2MT's Napier engine and side-mounted radiators were exchanged for a Hispano-Suiza engine and frontal radiator, and specific naval features such as folding wings were deleted.

Operational history
The type saw action in the early stages of Japan's Invasion of Manchuria in 1931, but it was found to be obsolete and was soon relegated to training duties.

Specifications

Notes

References

2MB1, Mitsubishi
2MB1